Christmas Is Here may refer to:

 Christmas Is Here, 2007 studio album by Michelle Tumes
 Christmas Is Here (Brandon Heath album), 2013
 Christmas Is Here (Danny Gokey album), 2015
 Christmas Is Here: The CDB Mixtape, 2020
 "Christmas Is Here", a 2010 single from Buckcherry